John Peter Kleinow (July 20, 1877 – October 9, 1929) was a reserve catcher in Major League Baseball who played from 1904 through 1911 for the New York Highlanders (1904–10), Boston Red Sox (1910–11) and Philadelphia Phillies (1911). He was born in Milwaukee, Wisconsin.

In an eight-season career, Kleinow was a .213 hitter (354-for-1665) with three home runs and 135 RBI in 584 games, including 146 runs, 45 doubles, 20 triples and 42 stolen bases.

Kleinow died in New York City at age 52.

External links

1877 births
1929 deaths
Boston Red Sox players
New York Highlanders players
Philadelphia Phillies players
Major League Baseball catchers
Baseball players from Milwaukee
Fort Wayne Indians players
Saginaw Salt Eaters players
Des Moines Hawkeyes players
Minneapolis Millers (baseball) players
Oakland Clamdiggers players
Toledo Mud Hens players
Cleveland Green Sox players
Montgomery Rebels players
St. Edward's Hilltoppers baseball players